Nymphicula banauensis is a moth in the family Crambidae. It was described by Speidel in 2003. It is found in the Philippines (Luzon).

References

Nymphicula
Moths described in 2003